The Mecachrome V634 engine (also known as Mecachrome Formula 2 V6) is a 3.4-litre, turbocharged and naturally-aspirated, V6 racing engine, designed, developed and produced by Mecachrome, and is used in the FIA Formula 2 Championship, FIA Formula 3 Championship, and the World Endurance Championship.

Formula 3 engine

First generation (second-generation overall)
The series will remain using the 3.4-litre V6 naturally-aspirated direct-injected engines supplied by Mecachrome until at least the 2021 season due to FIA Formula 3 Championship not being interested in a turbocharged engine.

Mecachrome V634 F3 V6 engines were crated and shipped to all FIA Formula 3 Championship teams on a serial-number basis as determined by the FIA to ensure equality and fairness in distribution.

Fuel and lubricants components
All Formula 3 cars currently use ordinary unleaded racing gasoline as fuel (similar to commercial vehicle unleaded street gasoline), which has been the de facto standard in third tier single-seater formula racing since the introduction of GP3 Series in 2010. Current Elf LMS 102 RON unleaded gasoline resembles ordinary unleaded gasoline but produces better mileage while being environmental-friendly and safer than other fuels. Since 2019, Elf exclusively continues providing the LMS 102 RON unleaded fuel and also Elf HTX 840 0W-40 lubricants for all FIA Formula 3 Championship cars.

Formula 2 engine
The V634 Turbo engine is a  V6 turbocharged direct injection four-stroke piston Otto cycle 620 hp fuel-efficient engine developed and built by Mecachrome, and maintained by Teos Engineering. The engine was unveiled in 2017 along with the new Dallara F2 2018 chassis. Dutch turbocharger company Van Der Lee Turbo Systems currently supplies the turbochargers for all FIA Formula 2 Championship engines.

The valve train is a dual overhead camshaft configuration with four valves per cylinder. The crankshaft is made of alloy steel, with five main bearing caps. The pistons are forged aluminium alloy, while the connecting rods are machined alloy steel. The electronic engine management system is supplied by Magneti Marelli, firing a CDI ignition system. The engine lubrication is a dry-sump type, cooled by a single water pump.

The all-new engine fuel delivery system is gasoline direct injection instead of traditional electronic indirect injection. Mecachrome will continue providing new FIA Formula 2 engines from the 2018 season and beyond. The Mecachrome V634 Turbo engine is rev limited down to 8,750 rpm and weighs up to  including turbocharger. The firing ignition of the Mecachrome V634 Turbo engine is revolutionary digital inductive.

The Mecachrome V634 Turbo 3.4-litre single-turbocharged direct-injected Mecachrome V6 engine is an evolution of the GP3 engine, which is the solely supplied engine for the FIA Formula 2 Championship. With the addition of a single turbo, the engine underwent rigorous dyno testing, ahead of its racing debut. The Mecachrome V634 Turbo engines sells for up to €67,000 per unit by leasing and rebuilding.

The current second-generation FIA Formula 2 engine allocation is limited to one per season and lasts up to  after being rebuild. Mid-season engine changes, including during race weekend, is banned and may result in a grid penalty for the session.

Turbocharger 
Turbochargers were introduced from the start of 2018 season. Dutch turbocharger company Van Der Lee Turbo Systems currently supplies the turbochargers for all FIA Formula 2 Championship all-new engines using the MT134-50120 model. The turbocharger spin limit is 130,000 rpm but cannot exceed 125,000 rpm due to lower turbo boost pressure.

Fuel and lubricants components 
All Formula 2 cars currently use ordinary unleaded racing gasoline as fuel (similar to commercial vehicle unleaded street gasoline), which has been the de facto standard in second tier single-seater formula racing since the introduction of GP2 Series in 2005. Current Elf LMS 102 RON unleaded gasoline resembles ordinary unleaded gasoline but produces better mileage while being environmental-friendly and safer than leaded fuels. Since 2005 GP2 Series season, Elf exclusively continues providing the LMS 102 RON unleaded fuel and also Elf HTX 840 0W-40 lubricants for all FIA Formula 2 Championship cars due to in fact of Mecachrome's long-term technical partnership with Elf.

Applications
Dallara GP3/16
Dallara F3 2019
Dallara F2 2018
Ginetta G60-LT-P1

References

External links
Mecachrome official website in French language
Mecachrome official website in English language
FIA Formula 2 official website
FIA Formula 3 official website

Engines by model
FIA Formula 2 Championship
V6 engines
Gasoline engines by model